is a Japanese football player. She played for Japan national team and currently plays for Detroit City FC.

Club career
Yamaguchi previously played for Florida State Seminoles (NCAA), where she won the MAC Hermann Trophy in 2007. She played for Atlanta Beat (WPS) in the United States and Umeå IK, where she won the double, and made it to UEFA Champions Cup Final, and Hammarby in Sweden's Damallsvenskan. She became the first player in Florida State Soccer history to have her jersey retired.

National team career
On 28 July 2007, Yamaguchi debuted for Japan national team against United States. She played 18 games and scored 8 goals for Japan until 2011.

Club statistics

National team statistics

References

External links

1986 births
Living people
Association football people from Tokyo Metropolis
Japanese women's footballers
Japan women's international footballers
Nadeshiko League players
Damallsvenskan players
Nippon TV Tokyo Verdy Beleza players
Florida State Seminoles women's soccer players
Umeå IK players
Atlanta Beat (WPS) players
Hammarby Fotboll (women) players
Okayama Yunogo Belle players
Japanese expatriate footballers
Expatriate women's soccer players in the United States
Japanese expatriate sportspeople in the United States
Expatriate women's footballers in Sweden
Japanese expatriate sportspeople in Sweden
Asian Games medalists in football
Asian Games gold medalists for Japan
Footballers at the 2010 Asian Games
Women's association football forwards
Hermann Trophy women's winners
Medalists at the 2010 Asian Games
People from Nishitōkyō, Tokyo
Women's Professional Soccer players